Enām is a hamlet in Pul-i Alam District, Logar Province, in eastern Afghanistan. Located at an altitude of about 54 metres, Enam lies about 1 mile southeast of Shulak and some 4 miles northwest of Babus.

Name 
The full name of the hamlet is Qal'ah-ye Mullāh An'ām (Dari: قلعه ملا انعام) or Da Mullāh Enām kalaey (Pashto: د ملا انام کلي) meaning "the fort of Mullah An'ām" or "the fort of the beneficient mullah", which may refer to the originator of the hamlet.

References

Populated places in Logar Province